(NSFO; "National Socialist Leadership Officers") were officers of the German  in World War II tasked with teaching Nazi ideology to soldiers. It was regarded as important that some officers should have the responsibility of both military command and political instruction in the spirit of Nazism. In this respect, NSFO were different from political commissars of the Red Army, who did not have military command.

The  (National Socialist leadership staff) of the OKW was created by Adolf Hitler's directive of the 22 December 1943  and was put under the overall control of General Hermann Reinecke. His officers had to bring  soldiers closer to the Nazi worldview through lectures and discussion. The goal was to instill ideological conviction in order to reinforce combat morale and turn the tide of the war.

NSFO were regular  officers, but they had to be approved by a commission created by the head of the Nazi Party Chancellery Martin Bormann. This commission, presided by Wilhelm Ruder, had to check whether the men were "flawless" in the Nazi sense.  Ruder explained in a speech that, in the opinion of the Party Chancellery, the instruction of "political soldiers" and of the management had been neglected and correcting this would stabilize the Wehrmacht.

By the end of the year 1944, about 47,000 secondary NSFO and 1,100 primary NSFO participated in central training courses. In regiments and battalions, officers took NSFO-functions as side duties. Up to the Division level, NSFO were provided to commanders and placed under their authority. At the Company level, unit commanders took up the function of NSFO.

Literature 

 Waldemar Besson: Zur Geschichte des nationalsozialistischen Führungsoffiziers. In: Vierteljahrshefte für Zeitgeschichte 9 (1961), H. 1, p. 76–116. ifz-Archiv (PDF)
 Andreas Kunz: Wehrmacht und Niederlage. Die bewaffnete Macht in der Endphase der nationalsozialistischen Herrschaft 1944–1945. Schriftenreihe des Militärgeschichtlichen Forschungsamtes, Bd. 64, München 2005, ISBN 3-486-57673-9, p. 240–248.
 Peter Joachim Lapp: Hitlers NS-Führungsoffiziere 1944/45. Die letzten Propagandisten des Endsiegs, Helios, Aachen 2019, ISBN 978-3-86933-238-3.

References 

Wehrmacht
Nazism
Nazi Germany
Military history of Germany
Political communication
Nazi propaganda